Power Unlimited is a Dutch multi-format video games magazine. It is the biggest gaming magazine in the Benelux. The first issue was released in June 1993.

History
Power Unlimited started in June 1993 in Bjørn Bruinsma's basement as a new label of VNU Business Publications. With VNU's other labels being primarily free business magazines, a gaming magazine was considered a big risk that lacked a real audience. That's why they decided to start it up in Bjørn Bruinsma's basement. VNU started out with only freelance editors. One year later, the concept had proven itself worthy, and an Editor in Chief and Final Editor were employed. Since that first year, Power Unlimited has become the biggest gaming magazine of the Benelux countries.

Power Unlimited has expanded to other activities, organizing an annual gaming event since 2003, and hosting the television show Gamekings.

From November 2007, Power Unlimited was published by HUB Uitgevers (HUB Publishers), after being taken over from VNU Media.

In August 2013 HUB Uitgevers filed bankruptcy. As of September Power Unlimited was taken over by the newly formed Reshift Digital.

Features

Reviews
In the 25-year history of the magazine, more than 4,500 games have been reviewed. Reviewed games are given an overall score out of 100. Although several games have received scores high in the 90s, only twenty have been given a perfect 100: these are Escape From CyberCity, Mortal Kombat 2, Mortal Kombat 3, Mortal Kombat Trilogy, Sentinel Returns, Art of Fighting 2, Tekken, NBA Jam, Vampire Hunter, Gran Turismo 2, Super Mario Galaxy, Grand Theft Auto IV, LittleBigPlanet, Uncharted 2: Among Thieves, World of Warcraft: Cataclysm, Fallout 3 , Grand Theft Auto V, The Legend of Zelda: Breath of the Wild, Super Smash Bros. Ultimate and The Last of Us Part II.

Sometimes, however, such as with the game Dead or Alive Xtreme 2, a bogus score is given to make a statement. In the above case, the game was rewarded a score of 99, 1 point higher than The Legend of Zelda: Twilight Princess which was, according to the editor in question, extremely overrated.
This was also the case with the game Beavis and Butthead, which was given a 132. In the February issue of 2018 the game Purrfect Date was awarded with a score of 140.

Other features
The magazine offers news, (p)reviews, a column by either one of the editors or someone games-related, various miscellaneous articles, as well as a comic and a mailbox where readers can voice their opinion, or sometimes have their questions answered by the editors. Editors have stated that the magazine is as much about games as it is about the (gaming) lives of the editors, their experiences in the office, etc.

Target audience
The magazine targets the teenage gamer demographic, specifically male gamers between 12 and 20 years old. Because of the relatively young target audience, Power Unlimiteds tone of voice is often rather straightforward and humorous. For example: to most screenshots of featured games jokes and oneliners are added by Final Editor Ed Wiggemans.

Editorial team
When the magazine started in 1993, it started in the basement of the home of Bjørn Bruinsma. He was responsible for negotiating with legal and grey-area game importers, advertising and production, before VNU Media decided it was good enough to publish internally. The editorial team consisted of Bjørn Bruinsma (who wrote more than 80% of the first issue), Kees de Koning, Michael Schaeffer, Ben de Dood. David Lemereis and Adam Eeuwens. The publisher at VNU Media was Matt Heffels.

After a year, Power Unlimited hired two employees: Editor in Chief Edwin Ammerlaan and current Final Editor Ed Wiggemans. Although most online editors are working on a freelance basis, some of the editors of the paper magazine are employed.

The editorial team consists of:
 Martin Verschoor (Editor in Chief)
 Ed Wiggemans (Final Editor)
 Wouter Ferdinand Brugge
 Jan-Johan Belderok (nicknamed "JJ")
 Florian Houtkamp
 Jurjen Tiersma
 Willem van der Meulen (nicknamed "Graddus")
 Samuel Hubner Casado
 Tjeerd Lindeboom
 Simon Zijlemans	

The magazine styling is done by Johnny Rijbroek, the comic at the back of the magazine by Jordi Peters.

References

External links
 Power Unlimited website

1993 establishments in the Netherlands
Computer game magazines published in the Netherlands
Dutch-language magazines
Magazines established in 1993
Magazines published in Amsterdam
Monthly magazines published in the Netherlands